A fad or trend is any form of collective behavior that develops within a culture, a generation or social group in which a group of people enthusiastically follow an impulse for a short period.

Fads are objects or behaviors that achieve short-lived popularity but fade away. Fads are often seen as sudden, quick-spreading, and short-lived. Fads include diets, clothing, hairstyles, toys, and more. Some popular fads throughout history are toys such as yo-yos, hula hoops, and fad dances such as the Macarena, floss and the twist.

Similar to habits or customs but less durable, fads often result from an activity or behavior being perceived as emotionally popular or exciting within a peer group, or being deemed "cool" as often promoted by social networks. A fad is said to "catch on" when the number of people adopting it begins to increase to the point of being noteworthy. Fads often fade quickly when the perception of novelty is gone.

Overview
The specific nature of the behavior associated with a fad can be of any type including unusual language usage, distinctive clothing, fad diets or frauds such as pyramid schemes. Apart from general novelty, mass marketing, emotional blackmail, peer pressure, or the desire to "be hip" may drive fads. Popular celebrities can also drive fads, for example the highly popularizing effect of Oprah's Book Club.

Though some consider the term trend equivalent to fad, a fad is generally considered a quick and short behavior whereas a trend is one that evolves into a long term or even permanent change.

Economics

In economics, the term is used in a similar way. Fads are mean-reverting deviations from intrinsic value caused by social or psychological forces similar to those that cause fashions in political philosophies or consumerisation.

Formation of fads and how they spread 
Many contemporary fads share similar patterns of social organization. Several different models serve to examine fads and how they spread.

One way of looking at the spread of fads is through the top-down model, which argues that fashion is created for the elite, and from the elite, fashion spreads to lower classes. Early adopters might not necessarily be those of a high status, but they have sufficient resources that allow them to experiment with new innovations. When looking at the top-down model, sociologists like to highlight the role of selection. The elite might be the ones that introduce certain fads, but other people must choose to adopt those fads.

Others may argue that not all fads begin with their adopters. Social life already provides people with ideas that can help create a basis for new and innovative fads. Companies can look at what people are already interested in and create something from that information. The ideas behind fads are not always original; they might stem from what is already popular at the time. Recreation and style faddists may try out variations of a basic pattern or idea already in existence.

Another way of looking at the spread of fads is through a symbolic interaction view. People learn their behaviors from the people around them. When it comes to collective behavior, the emergence of these shared rules, meanings, and emotions are more dependent on the cues of the situation, rather than physiological arousal. This connection to symbolic interactionism, a theory that explains people’s actions as being directed by shared meanings and assumptions, explains that fads are spread because people attach meaning and emotion to objects, and not because the object has practical use, for instance. People might adopt a fad because of the meanings and assumptions they share with the other people who have adopted that fad. People may join other adopters of the fad because they enjoy being a part of a group and what that symbolizes. Some people may join because they want to feel like an insider. When multiple people adopt the same fad, they may feel like they have made the right choice because other people have made that same choice.

Termination of fads 
Primarily, fads end because all innovative possibilities have been exhausted. Fads begin to fade when people no longer see them as new and unique. As more people follow the fad, some might start to see it as "overcrowded", and it no longer holds the same appeal. Many times, those who first adopt the fad also abandon it first. They begin to recognize that their preoccupation with the fad leads them to neglect some of their routine activities, and they realize the negative aspects of their behavior. Once the faddists are no longer producing new variations of the fad, people begin to realize their neglect of other activities, and the dangers of the fad. Not everyone completely abandons the fad, however, and parts may remain.

A study examined why certain fads die out quicker than others. A marketing professor at the University of Pennsylvania's Wharton School of Business, Jonah Berger and his colleague, Gael Le Mens, studied baby names in the United States and France to help explore the termination of fads. According to their results, the faster the names became popular, the faster they lost their popularity. They also found that the least successful names overall were those that caught on most quickly. Fads, like baby names, often lose their appeal just as quickly as they gained it.

Collective behavior 
Fads can fit under the broad umbrella of collective behavior, which are behaviors engaged in by a large but loosely connected group of people. Other than fads, collective behavior includes the activities of people in crowds, panics, fashions, crazes, and more. Robert E. Park, the man who created the term collective behavior, defined it as "the behavior of individuals under the influence of an impulse that is common and collective, an impulse, in other words, that is the result of social interaction". Fads are seen as impulsive, driven by emotions; however, they can bring together groups of people who may not have much in common other than their investment in the fad.

Collective obsession 
Fads can also fit under the umbrella of "collective obsessions". Collective obsessions have three main features in common. The first, and most obvious sign, is an increase in frequency and intensity of a specific belief or behavior. A fad's popularity increases quickly in frequency and intensity, whereas a trend grows more slowly. The second is that the behavior is seen as ridiculous, irrational, or evil to the people who are not a part of the obsession. Some people might see those who follow certain fads as unreasonable and irrational. To these people, the fad is ridiculous, and people's obsession of it is just as ridiculous. The third is, after it has reached a peak, it drops off abruptly and then it is followed by a counter obsession. A counter obsession means that once the fad is over, if one engages in the fad they will be ridiculed. A fad's popularity often decreases at a rapid rate once its novelty wears off. Some people might start to criticize the fad after pointing out that it is no longer popular, so it must not have been "worth the hype".

See also

 Bandwagon effect
 :Category:Fads (notable fads through history)
 Coolhunting
 Crowd psychology
 Google Trends
 List of Internet phenomena
 Market trend
 Memetics
 Peer pressure
 Retro style
 Social mania
 Viral phenomenon
 15 minutes of fame
 Bellwether (1996 novel)

Notes

References

 
 
 Best, Joel (2006). Flavor of the Month: Why Smart People Fall for Fads. University of California Press. .
 Burke, Sarah. "5 Marketing Strategies, 1 Question: Fad or Trend?". Spokal.
 
 Conley, Dalton (2015). You may ask yourself: An introduction to thinking like a sociologist. New York: W.W. Norton & Co. .
  (review/summary)
 Griffith, Benjamin (2013). "College Fads". St. James Encyclopedia of Popular Culture – via Gale Virtual Reference Library.
 Heussner, Ki Mae. "7 Fads You Won't Forget". ABC News.
 
 Killian, Lewis M.; Smelser, Neil J.; Turner, Ralph H. "Collective behavior". Encyclopædia Britannica.

External links

 
 
Popular culture
Crowd psychology